The 2019–20 season was the 66th appearance in the top-tier level Greek Basket League for Aris Thessaloniki. The season and ended prematurely in March 2020, due to the COVID-19 pandemic. Aris Thessaloniki was in the 13th place and was going to be relegated. On 21 May 2020, after a vote that was held between the league's 14 teams, Panathinaikos OPAP was crowned the league's champion and none of the teams would be relegated. 

The club also competed in the Greek Basketball Cup and eliminated by Iraklis in Phase 2. The game held in Nick Galis Hall.

Aris Thessaloniki started the season with Soulis Markopoulos as its manager. After the lost league game against Panionios Su Casa, Soulis Markopoulos resigned and Aris Thessaloniki signed with Savvas Kamperidis

First-team squad

Roster changes

In

Out

Competitions

Overall

Overview

Manager's Overview

Soulis Markopoulos

Savvas Kamperidis

Greek Basket League

Regular season

Standings

Results overview

Matches

Greek Cup

Phase 2

Players' Statistics

Total Statistics

Shooting

Last updated: 7 March 2020
Source: Sum of the Below Tables

Basket League

Shooting

Last updated: 7 March 2020
Source: ESAKE

Greek Cup

Shooting

Last updated: 2 October 2019
Source: sportstats.gr

References

Aris B.C. seasons